Carlos Bellucci (1895–1953) was an Argentine actor who appeared in thirty one films during his career. He also appeared frequently on stage.

Selected filmography
 The Caranchos of Florida (1938)
 Candida, Woman of the Year (1943)
 Passport to Rio (1948)
 Valentina (1950)

References

Bibliography 
Pellettieri, Osvaldo. Pirandello y el teatro argentino (1920-1990). Editorial Galerna, 1997.

External links 
 

1895 births
1953 deaths
Argentine male film actors
Argentine male stage actors
Male actors from Buenos Aires
20th-century Argentine male actors
Bellucci